Andrew Graeme Pollock (born 14 November 1969) is a former first-class and List A cricketer who played for Transvaal and Easterns in the 1990s. He is the son of the South African Test cricketer Graeme Pollock, grandson of Andrew Maclean Pollock, and a cousin of Shaun Pollock. His brother is Anthony Pollock.

References

External links

South African cricketers
Gauteng cricketers
Easterns cricketers
1969 births
Living people
South African people of Scottish descent